Mantilla is a surname. Notable people with the surname include:

Agustin Mantilla (1944–2015), Peruvian economist, sociologist and politician
Ángeles Mantilla, Mexican chemical engineer
Blanca Alvarez Mantilla (1931–2000), Spanish journalist
Carlos Alberto Rentería Mantilla (1945–2020), former Colombian narcotrafficker and crime boss, presumed leader of the Norte del Valle Cartel
Evelyn Mantilla (born 1963), American politician from Connecticut
Fabio Gadea Mantilla (born 1931), Nicaraguan radio journalist, writer, and politician
Félix Mantilla Botella (born 1974), Spanish former professional tennis player
Félix Mantilla Lamela (born 1934), former Major League Baseball player
Francisco de Burgos Mantilla (1612–1672), Spanish Baroque painter of portraits and still lifes
Jesús Mantilla, Minister of Public Health and Social Development of Venezuela up to 2009
Luis Mantilla (1911–1987), Peruvian sports shooter
Manuel Mantilla (born 1973), Cuban amateur flyweight boxer 
María Isabel Ortiz Mantilla (born 1975), Mexican politician affiliated with the PAN
María Julia Mantilla (born 1984), Peruvian actress, dancer, model, teacher and beauty queen who won Miss World 2004 in China
Matias Mantilla (born 1981), Argentine footballer
Pablo Antonio Vega Mantilla (1919–2007), Roman Catholic Bishop of Juigalpa, Nicaragua,
Pepe Mantilla, Mexican sports broadcaster for the Los Angeles Lakers and USC Trojans football
Philip Sparrdal Mantilla (born 1993), Swedish footballer, defender in IFK Mariehamn
Ramón Mantilla Duarte (1925–2009), Colombian bishop of the Roman Catholic Diocese of Ipiales
Ray Mantilla (born 1934), American jazz drummer
Rosmit Mantilla (born 1982), Venezuelan politician
Tupac Mantilla (born 1978), Grammy-nominated percussionist from Bogotá, Colombia